Kwagunt Butte is a 6,377-foot-elevation summit located in the eastern Grand Canyon, in Coconino County of northern Arizona, US. It is situated adjacent to the East Rim, being the second (middle) major prominence along the Butte Fault. From south to north, and bordering the due-south flowing Colorado River (west bank), are Chuar Butte, Kwagunt Butte, Malgosa Crest, and the Nankoweap Mesa. All the prominences are near the end of Marble Canyon, (down to the Little Colorado River confluence), Marble Canyon being the start of the Grand Canyon.

Kwagunt Butte has a narrow, linear platform prominence, (only sparsely vegetated), that trends southwest–northeast. The high point is at the southwest (6,377 ft), the lower prominence at the northeast is 6158 ft.

Geology

The base rock units of Kwagunt Butte can be seen in the above photo. At the base of the large, red Redwall Limestone cliff, is the short cliff of Muav Limestone. The slope-forming, soft dull greenish Bright Angel Shale slopes down to the Colorado River. The Bright Angel Shale slopes are interlaced with shelves, and rock debris hiding the slopes. Because winds course through the canyon of the Colorado River, it is likely that some exposed slopes are swept clean, revealing these interlayered shelfs. At Tanner Graben just downstream, the windswept cliff of the basalt is also very debris free (a very vertical, and resistant, ~deep black cliff).

See also
 Chuar Butte
 Nankoweap Mesa, (the third & north “butte” along the Butte Fault system)
 Geology of the Grand Canyon area

References

External links

 Kwagunt Butte geology (etc); The Neoproterozoic Earth system revealed from the Chaur Group of Grand Canyon, Geological Society of America Professional Papers

Buttes of Arizona
Grand Canyon
Grand Canyon National Park
Landforms of Coconino County, Arizona
Mountains of Arizona
Mountains of Coconino County, Arizona
North American 1000 m summits